Uroš Radaković  (born 31 March 1994) is a Serbian footballer who plays for Turkish club Ankaragücü. He plays as central defender or defensive midfielder.

Career
Radaković made his debut in the Coppa Italia on 28 November 2012, against A.S. Livorno Calcio playing the full 90 minutes. He played his second Coppa Italia game on 19 December 2012 against S.S.C. Napoli, again featuring for the full 90 minutes in a 1–2 away victory.

In August 2015, he joined Czech side Sigma Olomouc.

In June 2018, he moved to Sparta Prague.

On 4 September 2019, he joined Russian Premier League club FC Orenburg on loan.

On 7 August 2020, Radaković joined Kazakhstan Premier League club FC Astana on loan.

On 24 February 2021, Radaković joined Ekstraklasa club Wisła Kraków on loan.

On 23 July 2021, he returned to Russian Premier League and signed with Arsenal Tula.

Career statistics

References

External links 
 

1994 births
Living people
Footballers from Belgrade
Serbian footballers
Serbia youth international footballers
Serbia under-21 international footballers
Association football defenders
FK Proleter Novi Sad players
Bologna F.C. 1909 players
Novara F.C. players
SK Sigma Olomouc players
AC Sparta Prague players
FC Orenburg players
FC Astana players
Wisła Kraków players
FC Arsenal Tula players
MKE Ankaragücü footballers
Serbian First League players
Serie B players
Czech First League players
Czech National Football League players
Moravian-Silesian Football League players
Russian Premier League players
Kazakhstan Premier League players
Ekstraklasa players
Süper Lig players
Serbian expatriate footballers
Expatriate footballers in Italy
Serbian expatriate sportspeople in Italy
Expatriate footballers in the Czech Republic
Serbian expatriate sportspeople in the Czech Republic
Expatriate footballers in Russia
Serbian expatriate sportspeople in Russia
Expatriate footballers in Kazakhstan
Serbian expatriate sportspeople in Kazakhstan
Expatriate footballers in Poland
Serbian expatriate sportspeople in Poland
Expatriate footballers in Turkey
Serbian expatriate sportspeople in Turkey